Konspiracija ("conspiracy") was a secret society that sought to overthrow the Yugoslav regency.

The board, according to a document, included Dragiša Vasić, Mladen Žujović and Momir Nikolić, and contributors on military questions, Antonije Antić, Velimir Vemić and Staniša Kostić. According to lieutenant Staniša Kostić, several members of the Serbian Cultural Club (SKK) were founders of the conspiracy group. The organization was modeled after the Black Hand, including the recruitment process. Antonije Antić and Velimir Vemić, two former Black Hand members, gave instructions on how to establish secret 5-men groups within the Yugoslav Army (VJ). It would have easy approach to higher military leaders via already existing channels between leaders of opposition and friendly military personnel.

The organization opposed the Yugoslav accession to the Tripartite Pact on 25 March 1941. Two days later, the Yugoslav coup d'état was successful.

Members

Dragiša Vasić, lawyer and World War I veteran, member of SKK
Mladen Žujović, lawyer and World War I veteran, member of SKK
Momir Nikolić
Antonije Antić, member of Black Hand
Velimir Vemić, member of Black Hand
Staniša Kostić, lieutenant
Srba Popov, major

See also
Conspiracy groups against the Yugoslav regency
Vladislav Ribnikar's group
Mustafa Golubić's communist group

References

Sources

External links

 Illuminate - The Secret Society

1938 establishments in Yugoslavia
Kingdom of Yugoslavia
Organizations based in Yugoslavia
Defunct organizations based in Serbia
Yugoslav Serbia
Defunct clubs and societies
Secret societies